The 2009 Finnish Athletics Championships were held in the Leppävaaran stadion in Espoo from July 31 to August 2, 2009. The event served as a qualification tournament for the 2009 World Championships staged from August 15 to August 23, 2009 in Berlin, Germany.

Results

See also
Finland at the 2009 World Championships in Athletics

References
live.time4results

Finnish Athletics Championships
2009 
Athletics Championships